WFPR is a Classic Country formatted broadcast radio station.  The station is licensed to Hammond, Louisiana and serves Tangipahoa Parish, and Greater New Orleans in Louisiana.  WFPR is owned by Northshore Media Group and operated under their North Shore Broadcasting Co., Inc. licensee.

Translator
In addition to WFPR's primary frequency, the station's programming is simulcast on the following translator station, on the FM band, to widen WFPR's broadcast area.

References

External links
 The Boss Country Online
 

1947 establishments in Louisiana
Classic country radio stations in the United States
Radio stations established in 1947
Radio stations in Louisiana